The Konrad Zuse Medal for Services to Computer Science is the highest award of the  (German Computer Science Society), given every two years to one or sometimes two leading German computer scientists. It is named after German computer pioneer Konrad Zuse.
Note that a different medal with the same name is also given out by the Zentralverband des Deutschen Baugewerbes (Central Association of German Construction).

Recipients
Source: Gesellschaft für Informatik
1987: Heinz Billing

1989: Nikolaus Joachim Lehmann
1989: Robert Piloty
1991: 
1993: Carl Adam Petri
1995: Kurt Mehlhorn
1997: José Luis Encarnação
1999: Günter Hotz
2001: Theo Härder
2003: Thomas Lengauer
2006: Ingo Wegener
2007: Manfred Broy
2009: Reinhard Wilhelm
2011: Fritz-Rudolf Güntsch
2011: Volker Strassen
2013: Markus Gross
2015: Arndt Bode
2017: Johannes Buchmann
2019: Dorothea Wagner
2021: Gerhard Weikum

See also
 List of computer science awards
 List of prizes named after people

References

1987 establishments in Germany
Awards established in 1987
Computer science awards
German science and technology awards
Lists of computer scientists
Lists of German people
Medal